Innovid is an online advertising technology company that offers services used by advertisers and publishers for the distribution and management of digital ads. Originally launched as a video marketing platform, the company expanded its offering to include display and digital out-of-home when Herolens was acquired in 2019.

History 
Innovid was founded in 2007 by Zvika Netter, Tal Chalozin, and Zack Zigdon. Prior to starting Innovid, Netter and Chalozin co-founded the tech hub and nonprofit organization GarageGeeks where high-profile tech personalities from around the world came to speak about innovation, including Sergey Brin, Craig Mundie, and Wikipedia co-founder Jimmy Wales.

In 2008, Innovid raised $3 million from Genesis Partners in a Series A round.

As of 2015, the company had raised $52.6 million in six rounds of funding from investors including Genesis Partners, NewSpring Capital, Silicon Valley Bank, Cisco Investments, and Sequoia Capital.

In November 2017, the company announced a deal to acquire Taykey, a Tel Aviv-based company focusing on real-time, automatic ad targeting software.

In January 2019, Innovid secured $30 million in pre-IPO funding from Goldman Sachs to further its interests in the connected TV sector.

In September 2019, Innovid acquired the display advertising software company Herolens, based in Latin America. Herolens continued to operate its Buenos Aires office, which became the headquarters for Innovid's Latin American business.

In February 2022, Innovid announced that it would acquire TVSquared for $160 million.

Corporate affairs

Leadership 
Innovid is managed by CEO Zvika Netter. Other key executives are:

 Tal Chalozin, CTO
 Zack Zigdon, MD International 
 Guy Kuperman, CSO
 Ken Markus, CCO

Partnerships 
Innovid is an open-platform and has established several partnerships with third-party vendors, media companies, agencies, and publishers.

Innovid partnered with Roku to deliver personalized, targeted, and interactive video ads via Roku apps and allow viewers to easily subscribe to specific channels with a click of the remote.

In February 2016, Innovid announced a partnership with Snapchat, to provide advertisers with detailed analytics about ad campaigns. Two months later, Innovid rolled out an integration with Facebook and Instagram, to help marketers deliver interactive video ads to both platforms while tracking analytics. In June 2016, Innovid also teamed up with Twitter to give advertisers access to more data about Twitter video ad campaigns. In December 2016, Innovid partnered with marketing clouds Oracle, Adobe, and IBM, enabling marketers for the first time to include video throughout the customer journey.

MODI Media, the advanced TV arm of GroupM and the largest advertising media company in the world, recognized Innovid’s strong focus on the connected TV/ OTT market and began collaborating with the company to power all of MODI Media’s OTT video delivery and analytics.

In September 2019, Innovid and Roku announced that they were partnering on advertising measurement tools that would report across over-the-top (OTT) and traditional TV. Innovid's connected TV data would be matched with Roku's automatic content recognition (ACR) data to measure daily reach, frequency, and demographics.

Awards 
 2009 Tech Pioneers Who Will Change Your Life: Zvika Netter
 2010 World Economic Forum Tech Pioneers: Tal Chalozin
 2011 Streaming Media 100 Companies That Matter Most in Online Video
 2012 Digiday Video Awards Best Video Technology Innovation
 2014 Digiday Video Awards Best In-Stream Video Ad
 2014 Interactive Advertising Bureau MIXX IAB Rising Stars Digital Video Ad Gold Winner
 2015 Crain’s Best Places to Work in NYC
 2015 Interactive Advertising Bureau MIXX IAB Rising Stars Digital Video Ad Gold Winner
 2015 AdAge's Best Places to Work
 2016 Inc. Magazine's Best Workplaces
 2016 Multichannel News' 40 Under 40
 2016 Stevie Award Winner for Women in Business: Beth-Ann Eason
 2016 Interactive Advertising Bureau MIXX IAB Award: Best Interactive Video Ad
 2016 Crain Communications Best Places To Work in New York City
 2016 Los Angeles Business Journal Best Places To Work in Los Angeles
2018 Drum Digital Trading Award for Best Creative Optimization

Patents 
US Patent No. 8745657 Inserting interactive objects into video content

External links 
Official website

References

Marketing companies established in 2007
American companies established in 2007
2007 establishments in New York City
Companies based in New York City
Digital marketing companies of the United States